The Department of Transportation is a part of the Government of New Brunswick.  It is charged with the maintenance of the provincial highway network and the management of the province's automobile fleet.

The department was established in 1967 when Premier Louis Robichaud split the Department of Public Works and Highways.  In 2012, it returned to these roots when it was merged with most of the Department of Supply and Services to form a new Department of Transportation and Infrastructure.

Ministers 

* Williams continued with responsibility for this department when it was merged into the new Department of Transportation & Infrastructure.

References

External links
Department of Transportation

Transportation
1967 establishments in New Brunswick
Defunct transport organizations based in Canada